Bahjat Etorjman (born 24 June 1995) is a Libyan singer and songwriter. He grew up in Tripoli, the capital of Libya before moving to Malta during the beginning of the Arab Spring in 2011. In the fall of 2017, Bahjat attended Musikmakarna, a pop music academy in the north of Sweden. Shortly after, Bahjat moved to Stockholm where he still is today making music. He is best known for his songs "Istanbul", "Hometown Smile" and "Halba".

With over 22,5 million on-demand streams and 70 million+ collective views on YouTube, Bahjat is already one of the most successful Libyan music artists in history. His self-made success story has earned him appearances on high-profile platforms such as BBC Arabic, Aftonbladet, Al Arabiya, The National, and The Times of Malta.
 
Bahjat released his first single "Stand Tall" in Malta in 2015, followed by "Talk To Me" (2016), a song that topped the Maltese charts after a month. After appearing on a Nightcore YouTube channel, Bahjat's "Hometown Smile" (2017) went viral within the community, accumulating over 65 million views on YouTube, and pushing the song to over 5 million streams on Spotify.

Following his debut EP, "3:11 am" (2017), Bahjat released the singles "Do you remember me?" (2018) and "What We Were" (2019) with both singles finding support from Spotify editorial playlists such as Fresh Finds & New Music Friday. In September 2019 Bahjat released “Istanbul”, marking the mix of Arabic and English as his signature style. “Istanbul” became one of his two most streamed songs in the Arab world in 2019.

Bahjat's release “Halba" (English: “Too Much”) in April 2020, was another stepping stone for the young artist - elevating his career to new heights. Upon release, the song instantly sky-rocketed to the top 5 of Anghami's international pop chart, and Spotify Arabia celebrated its release by inviting Bahjat to take over their official Instagram account.

Just a few months later, Bahjat released his first solo Arabic track, “Yjeek Youm” (English: “a day will come for you”). Prior to “Yjeek Youm”, Bahjat's only song in Arabic was his 2019 collaboration with Egyptian DJ/Producer Hassan El Shafei, titled “Galbek Ween”, which became the most streamed Libyan song on Anghami and one of the biggest hits of the Arab world on Spotify in 2019 with 3,5 million streams.

In early summer, Bahjat teamed up with Deezer to remake 2002's iconic “Youm Wara Youm” for the “Home Sessions” compilation. “Youm Wara Youm” is originally sung by the Moroccan artist Samira Said and Algerian artist Cheb Mami which became one of the most successful Arabic songs in history.

For his November release, “You Got That (Hometown Smile)”, Bahjat partnered with Sweden-based crowdfunding platform Corite(founded by Universal Music alumnus). The song was released as a tribute to Bahjat's own song “Hometown Smile” and its widespread message of finding home in a smile of the loved one.

Biography
Bahjat Etorjman was born on June 24, 1995 in Tripoli, the capital of Libya. He has 3 siblings.
At the tender age of two, Bahjat started singing, and later picked up a guitar when he was 13 years old - marking the age where he would also start writing songs. When he turned 15, his mom bought him a webcam, and through that, he uploaded his first YouTube cover - a video that showed a young aspiring artist deciding to start his music career journey.

When the Arab spring started in 2011, Bahjat and his family fled to Malta, which was a major turning point in his life. Bahjat coped with these changes by continuing to write music, which led him to a road of self-exploration and helped him develop a sharp vision for his future.

In the fall of 2017, Bahjat seized an opportunity to spend a few months at Musikmakarna, a pop music academy in the north of Sweden. That was when he decided to pack his backpack, and never look back. In the academy, he met his songwriting and production heroes Max Martin and Johan Shellback, who encouraged his talent. Shortly after, Bahjat moved to Stockholm, where he is making his music.

Bahjat is working hard towards reaching his goals. Embracing his identity and journey, he shares narratives that are authentic, exciting and inviting. With today's music landscape being more multicultural than ever, Bahjat is emerging as a fresh face from the Arab region, redefining A-pop and offering ambitious youth a much-needed role model.

By blazing trails and overcoming hardships, Bahjat is an advocate for the fact that one's circumstances do not define their future. On his journey as an independent artist, he strives to inspire others to dream big and work hard to make it happen.

Discography
EPs
 3:11 am, 2017

Singles

References 

1995 births
Living people
21st-century Libyan male singers
English-language singers from Libya
21st-century Swedish male singers
People from Tripoli, Libya
Singers from Stockholm